The Morin river is a tributary of the Rivière aux Écorces, flowing in the unorganized territory of Lac-Ministuk, in the Le Fjord-du-Saguenay Regional County Municipality, in the administrative region of Saguenay–Lac-Saint-Jean, in province from Quebec, to Canada. The course of the Morin River crosses the northwestern part of the Laurentides Wildlife Reserve.

The small Morin River valley is located near route 169. This valley is also served by some secondary forest roads, especially for forestry and recreational tourism activities.

Forestry is the main economic activity in this valley; recreational tourism, second.

The surface of the Morin River is usually frozen from the beginning of December to the end of March, however the safe circulation on the ice is generally made from mid-December to mid-March.

Geography 
This watercourse flows parallel to the Rivière aux Écorces before flowing into it, near the Sawine River. The Morin River crosses the road connecting Quebec (city) to Lac-Saint-Jean, in the northern part of the Laurentides Wildlife Reserve; both the lake and the river are used for speckled trout fishing.

The main watersheds neighboring the Morin River are:
 north side: Alexis lake, Bras des Angers, Pikauba River, Plessis stream, Barnabé stream, ruisseau L'Abbé, Rivière aux Écorces;
 east side: Sawine River, Pika River, Pikauba River, Le Grand Ruisseau, Damasse stream, Petite rivière Pikauba, Cyriac River;
 south side: Girard stream, Blanc stream, Pika River, Rivière aux Canots;
 west side: Rivière aux Écorces, Thom stream, Paul stream, Lac de la Belle Rivière, Carpe lake, Métabetchouane River.

The Morin River originates from a mountain stream in a forest area in the Laurentides Wildlife Reserve. This source is located at:
  south of Morin Lake;
  west of Pika Lake;
  west of Hocquart Lake;
  north of Rivière aux Canots;
  east of the Rivière aux Écorces;
  south-west of route 169;
  south of the confluence of the Morin river and the Rivière aux Écorces;
  south-east of lac Saint-Jean.

Upper course of the Morin River (segment of )

  towards the north, curving towards the northwest at the end of the segment up to the outlet (coming from the northwest) of Lac des Panicauts;
  towards the north-east, forming a hook towards the east, up to the outlet (coming from the south) of Lac Cadieux;
  northwards to the outlet (coming from the south-east) of the lakes of Eminence, Gareau and the Ephemera;
  to the north, forming small coils up to the outlet (coming from the southeast) of Lac Morin;

Intermediate course of the Morin River (segment of )

  towards the northwest by forming small streamers at the end of the segment up to the outlet (coming from the west) of Choquette Lake;
  first towards the east, then towards the north by forming a large curve towards the east, then forming a loop towards the west at the end of the segment, up to a stream (coming from the east);
  towards the northwest by forming a hook towards the north, up to the highway 169 bridge;

Lower course of the Morin River (segment of )

  north-west, to the outlet (coming from the south-west) of the Lac des Trois Îles;
  towards the north-west, meandering through a plain comprising three areas of marshes to the east shore of Lac Gatien;
  towards the north-east, bypassing a peninsula from the west across the lake in Gatien formed by the widening of the river, up to its mouth. Note: this lake is surrounded by marshes. It is fed by the Toupillons pond and Lor lake;
  north-east in the marsh zone at the start of the segment, forming a large S, then crossing the lake in Arche formed by the widening of the river, up to its mouth;
  north-east, to its mouth.

The Morin River flows onto the south bank of the Rivière aux Écorces. This confluence is located at:

  south-west of the confluence of the Sawine River and the Rivière aux Écorces;
  west of the Pikauba River;
  north-east of lac de la Belle Rivière;
  south of the confluence of the Pikauba and the Écorces rivers;
  south-west of the confluence of the Pikauba River and Kenogami Lake;
  southwest of the confluence of the Chicoutimi River and the Saguenay River in the Chicoutimi sector of the city of Saguenay (city).

Toponymy 
In 1914, this watercourse appeared on a map under the name of "Rivière Vaseuse"; in 1928, the same name appears on another card accompanied by the variant "Rivière Morin". This last toponym is indicated later on maps of 1943 and 1954.

The name of Morin evokes the life work of Joseph Morin (Baie-Saint-Paul, 1854 - Québec, 1915), merchant, farmer and secretary-treasurer of the Charlevoix municipality, before embarking on active politics. He was elected Liberal MP for the riding of Charlevoix from 1886 to 1897, then re-elected in 1900. Not having stood in the 1904 election, he was appointed governor of the prison in Quebec (city) two years later, a post he held from 1906 to 1915.

More than a hundred geographic entities, essentially lakes and small rivers, evoke various people of this patronym in different regions of Quebec territory.

The toponym "Rivière Morin" was formalized on December 5, 1968, at the Place Names Bank of the Commission de toponymie du Québec.

Notes and references

Appendices

Related articles 
 Le Fjord-du-Saguenay Regional County Municipality
 Lac-Ministuk, a TNO
 Laurentides Wildlife Reserve
 Rivière aux Écorces
 Pikauba River
 Kenogami Lake
 Chicoutimi River
 Saguenay River
 List of rivers of Quebec

Rivers of Saguenay–Lac-Saint-Jean
Le Fjord-du-Saguenay Regional County Municipality
Laurentides Wildlife Reserve